Rozetta Andreyevna Zhilina (8 June 1933, Leningrad – 11 December 2003, Snezhinsk) was a Soviet and Russian mathematician and computer scientist.

Education 
She graduated from the Mathematics and Mechanics department of the Leningrad State University in 1956, where one of her classmates was Anatoly Vershik.

Career 
She worked at the All-Russian Scientific Research Institute Of Technical Physics in the mathematical section.

After World War II, the Soviet Union began an ambitious program to develop their own computing technology, creating systems to rival those in the United States. Computer science research was often kept secret during the ongoing Cold War, but was seen as an important field nonetheless. From the 1960s to the 1980s, women represented half of the students in this area in Soviet universities and they later went on to work in the field, either as programmers or system designers.

Zhilina developed algorithms and computer programs for solving problems in physics, mechanics and the non-stationary thermal conductivity of complex nuclear weapons. Under her leadership, computer programs were developed to solve problems in the field of optimal trajectories of nuclear weapons, including their ballistics.

Awards and honours 
She was a laureate of the USSR State Prize (1988), the Medal "For Labour Valour" (1962) and the Order of the Red Banner of Labour (1975).

Death 
Zhilina died in Snezhinsk in 2003, and is interred in the town cemetery.

References 

1933 births
2003 deaths
20th-century Russian women scientists
Mathematicians from Saint Petersburg
Saint Petersburg State University alumni
Recipients of the Order of the Red Banner of Labour
Recipients of the USSR State Prize
Russian computer programmers
Russian women computer scientists
Soviet computer scientists
Soviet women mathematicians